The 1997 Belgian Super Cup was a football match which was played on 6 August 1997, between the winner of the 1996–97 Belgian First Division, Lierse, and the winner of the 1996–97 Belgian Cup, Germinal Ekeren. Lierse won the match 1-0, their first Super Cup victory.

Match details

References 

1997
Lierse S.K.
Beerschot A.C.
1997–98 in Belgian football
August 1997 sports events in Europe